Mad City may refer to:
Mad City (film), a 1997 film starring John Travolta and Dustin Hoffman
"Mad City" (Gotham), the subtitle of the first half of season 3 of Gotham
Mad City (video game), a 1988 Japanese video game released internationally as The Adventures of Bayou Billy
"Mad City", nickname of Madison, Wisconsin

See also
"M.A.A.D City", a 2012 song by Kendrick Lamar
"Mad City: Chapter 2" a Roblox game created in 2019 by the legendary game studio: Schwifty Studios
"Mad City", a track on the 2016 mini-album NCT 127 (EP)